Enzo Mezzapesa (born 18 May 1962 in Differdange) is a Luxembourgish former road cyclist. He was professional from 1986 to 1988.

Major results
1986
 1st  Road race, National Road Championships
 1st Grand Prix des Artisans de Manternach
1987
 1st  Road race, National Road Championships
1988
 1st  Road race, National Road Championships
1996
 1st  Road race, National Road Championships
1997
 3rd Road race, National Road Championships

References

1962 births
Living people
Luxembourgian male cyclists
People from Differdange